László Budai (19 July 1928 –  2 July 1983), also known as László Bednarik, or Budai II, was a former Hungarian footballer and coach. Budai was born in Budapest and played as a midfielder and forward for Ferencvárosi TC, Honvéd and Hungary. During the 1950s he was a member of the legendary Hungarian national team known as the Mighty Magyars. Other members of the team included Ferenc Puskás, Zoltán Czibor, Sándor Kocsis, József Bozsik and Nándor Hidegkuti. The stadium of Rákospalotai EAC was named after him.

Club career

During his career, Budai won four Hungarian League titles. The first of these came at Ferencvárosi TC in 1949 where his teammates included Zoltán Czibor and Sándor Kocsis. In January 1949 when Hungary became a communist state, Ferencváros were deemed unsuitable to become an army or police club because of its right-wing and nationalist traditions.  Instead they were taken over by ÉDOSZ, a food workers union and their best players, including Budai, Czibor and Kocsis, were conscripted into the army team, Honvéd. While at Honvéd, Budai won a further three league titles and the Mitropa Cup.

Hungarian International

Budai made his debut for Hungary on 2 May 1949 in a 6–1 win against Austria in the Central European Championship. He subsequently played 39 times for Hungary and scored 10 goals. Four of these goals came in a 12–0 win against Albania on 24 September 1950. As one of the legendary Mighty Magyars, he helped Hungary become Olympic Champions in 1952, and Central European Champions in 1953. He also played in the Hungary side that defeated England 6–3 at Wembley Stadium. During the 1954 FIFA World Cup he played in the group stage in the 9–0 win against South Korea and in the semi-final against Uruguay. However, despite an excellent performance in the latter game, he was dropped for the final to make room for Ferenc Puskás.  He also played two games at the 1958 World Cup.

Honours

Hungary
Olympic Champions
1952
Central European Champions
1953
World Cup
Runner-up: 1954

Ferencváros TC
Hungarian Champions: 1
1949

Honvéd FC

Hungarian Champions: 3
1952, 1954, 1955
Mitropa Cup: 1
1959

References

Sources
Behind The Curtain – Travels in Eastern European Football: Jonathan Wilson (2006)

External links
 Hungary stats

1928 births
1983 deaths
Footballers from Budapest
Hungarian footballers
Association football midfielders
Hungary international footballers
Hungarian football managers
Ferencvárosi TC footballers
Budapest Honvéd FC players
Footballers at the 1952 Summer Olympics
Olympic footballers of Hungary
Olympic gold medalists for Hungary
1954 FIFA World Cup players
1958 FIFA World Cup players
Olympic medalists in football
Medalists at the 1952 Summer Olympics
1974 African Cup of Nations managers